The Lycée Sainte-Geneviève is a private lycée, located in Versailles and providing preparatory classes for grandes écoles. It was founded by the Jesuits in Paris in April 1854. It is often nicknamed Ginette and sometimes BJ, standing for Boite à Jèzes (Box of Jesuits).

Academics

Sainte-Geneviève is famous for having among the highest success rates at the entrance exams of the most selective French grandes écoles in the fields of engineering (École Polytechnique, Mines ParisTech, École des Ponts ParisTech, and CentraleSupélec) and commerce (HEC Paris, ESSEC Business School and ESCP Business School).

Ginette provides PC/PC*, MP/MP*, PT/PT*, PSI*, ECS and BCPST classes.

Notable alumni

Military
 Hubert Lyautey (1854–1934), Marshal of France
 Jean de Lattre de Tassigny (1889–1952), Marshal of France
 Antoine Béthouart (1889–1982), Compagnon de la Libération
 Henry de Bournazel (1898–1933)
 Honoré d'Estienne d'Orves (1901–1941), Compagnon de la Libération
 Philippe Leclerc de Hauteclocque (1902–1947), Compagnon de la Libération and marshal of France (Marshall Leclerc)
 Pierre Segrétain (1909–1950), commander of the 1st Foreign Parachute Battalion
 Alain de Boissieu (1914–2006), Compagnon de la Libération and Chief of Staff of the French Army
 Tom Morel (1915–1944), Compagnon de la Libération
 Jean-Louis Battet (born 1944), admiral, Chief of Staff of the French Navy from 2001 to 2005
 Édouard Guillaud (born 1953), admiral, Chief of the Defence Staff since 2010

CEOs
 Étienne Audibert (1888-1954), second CEO of EDF from 1947 to 1949
 Pierre Gadonneix (born 1943), CEO of Gaz de France from 1996 to 2000, then CEO of EDF from 2004 to 2009
 Louis Gallois (born 1944), CEO of SNCF, then CEO of EADS and CEO of Airbus
 Marc Tessier (born 1946), former chairman of France Télévisions
 Jean-Martin Folz (born 1947), former chairman and CEO of PSA Peugeot Citroën
 Philippe Varin (born 1953), CEO of PSA Peugeot Citroën (2009-2014)
 Benoît Potier (born 1957), CEO of Air Liquide
 Édouard Michelin (1963–2006), former CEO of Michelin
 Pierre Simon (1885-1977), first CEO of EDF (1946-1947)
 Tidjane Thiam (born 1962), CEO of Crédit Suisse
 Karim Beqqali, (born 1981), CEO of Yamed Group
 Erwan Menard (born 1973), ex CEO of Elastifile, sold to Google

Politicians
 Jean-François Deniau (1928–2007), statesman, diplomat, essayist and novelist ; member of the Académie française
 Laurent Touvet (born 1962), conseiller d'État, directeur des libertés publiques et des affaires juridiques au ministère de l'Intérieur
 Valérie Pécresse (born 1967), Minister for Higher Education and Research
 Emmanuelle Mignon (born 1968), civil servant and chief of staff of President Nicolas Sarkozy

Scientists
 Albert Jacquard (1925–2013), statistician, geneticist
 Xavier Le Pichon (born 1937), geophysicist, professor at Collège de France, member of the Académie des Sciences
 Ivar Ekeland (born 1944), mathematician
 Albert Ducrocq (1921–2001), scientific, journalist and essayist
 Stanislas Dehaene (born 1965), mathematician and cognitivist, professor at Collège de France, member of the Académie des Sciences
 Elyès Jouini (born 1965), economist, member of the Institut universitaire de France

Others
 Tirso de Olazábal, Count of Arbelaiz (1842-1921), politician
 Pierre Savorgnan de Brazza (1852–1905), explorer
 Blessed Charles de Foucauld (1858–1916), explorer and Catholic religious
 Prince Hubert de Broglie (1903–1972)
 Yves du Manoir (1904–1928), rugby player
 Jean Bastien-Thiry (1927–1963), attempted to assassinate French President Charles de Gaulle
 Bernard Fresson (1931–2002),  cinema actor
 Philippe Sollers (born 1936), writer
 Patrick Peugeot (born 1937), president of the Cimade
 Bernard Ramanantsoa (born 1948), dean of HEC Paris from 1996 to 2015
 Bernard de Montmorillon (born 1950), dean of Paris Dauphine University from 1999 to 2007
 Mac Lesggy (born 1962), scientific journalist
 Julien Coupat (born 1974), political activist

See also
 List of Jesuit sites

References

External links
 Official website
 Alumni website

Private schools in France
Lycées in Yvelines
Educational institutions established in 1854
Schools in Versailles
1854 establishments in France